Dustz (currently stylized as DUSTZ) is a Japanese rock band fronted by French-Japanese actor Ray Fujita. Formed by Fujita and two of his classmates from the Lycée franco-japonais de Tokyo, the group has gained national renown by performing theme songs to various shows, including Sengoku Basara: Samurai Kings, Blood-C. and most recently Zero: Black Blood.

Dustz's first album Trois was released by Epic Records Japan on December 14, 2011. Its deluxe edition was released in Digipak form with a DVD of Dustz's music videos.

Members
Ray: Vocals
Gus: Bass
Kohei: Guitar
Koji Shiouchi: DJ

Former members
NZM: Guitar
80 (Etienne): Guitar
Naoki: Drums
KenT: Guitar

Discography

Albums
Trois - December 14, 2011

Singles
Indies No label
"Pain" - October 2006
"Never Again" - January 2007
"L&P Compilation CD" - March 9, 2007
"World" - March 9, 2007
Indies Be On Key Records
"Future" - March 26, 2008
"Lapis lazuli" - February 14, 2009
Major Epic Records Japan
"Break & Peace" - May 27, 2009
Sengoku Basara: Samurai Kings ending theme
"Brilliant Day" - October 7, 2009
Oretachi wa Tenshi da! NO ANGEL NO LUCK insert song
"Criez" - April 6, 2011
"spiral" - August 31, 2011
Blood-C opening theme
Major DolceStar Records
"S#0(Scene Number Zero)" - March 8, 2014
Zero: Black Blood ending theme

References

External links

Profile at Sony Music Japan

Japanese rock music groups
Sony Music Entertainment Japan artists